This list of sociology awards is an index to articles about of notable awards given to persons, groups, or institutions for their contributions to the study of sociology.

See also

 Lists of awards
 List of social sciences awards

References

 
sociology